The Solidarity Transport Hub or Central Communication Port (CPK), is a megaproject of the Government of Poland aimed at the construction of a new, built-from-scratch airport to be located approximately  southwest of Warsaw. The opening of CPK would not mean that Warsaw Chopin Airport would be closed; no official decision has been made. The English name "Solidarity Transport Hub Poland" is proposed for the project by its website. 

The planned launch of the port is 2028. At first the airport is to have two runways (4,000 m × 45 m), but ultimately four. The combined airport and train station will plan to serve 40 million passengers per year - around the scale of Berlin Brandenburg Airport - and ultimately around 100 million passengers. Planned train connections will take 15 minutes to Warsaw Central railway station, 25 minutes to Łódź Fabryczna railway station, and 2 hours to most other major Polish cities, such as Kraków, Wrocław, Poznań and Gdańsk. The construction of a high-speed train to Frankfurt (Oder) is also planned, which is to shorten the travel time on the Berlin - CPK route below 3.5 hours.

Location

The airport's planned site is about 40 km west of Warsaw, next to the village Stanisławów which is part of Gmina Baranów in Grodzisk Mazowiecki County. The Baranow commune occupies a significant part of the Grodzisk County and, despite its rural character, has an extensive road infrastructure. The A2 autostrada and railway lines run in the immediate vicinity of the potential construction site, and Wrocław (Expressway S8) and Poznań (national road No. 92) is nearby.

The choice of the location was made after a number of areas were examined. Before recommending Baranów, the Arup consulting company analyzed a list of potential locations, including: Modlin, Wołomin, Sochaczew, Mszczonów, Babsk, Nowe Miasto nad Pilicą, Grójec and Radom-Sadków. Experts took into account the distance from Warsaw, transport accessibility, land accessibility and environmental restrictions, including noise levels. Analyses showed that Baranów offers an optimal location for the project.

History
Discussion about a new airport to replace Warsaw Chopin Airport began in the 2000s. On 12 May 2005, the Civil Aviation Office signed a contract with the Spanish consortium Ineco-Sener to carry out a feasibility study of the central airport. Such a study was nevertheless not actually carried out during the next two years, which was interpreted as a sign that the project of a new big central airport was being postponed until an indeterminate future. Nevertheless, a new airport serving Warsaw was proposed in the government's Transport Infrastructure Development Strategy for 2010–2013. 

After the Law and Justice party regained power in Poland the project gained pace, with the government approving the plan in November 2017.

On 17 June 2018, the residents of the district of Baranów, Grodzisk Mazowiecki County voted down the plan to build the new airport. With 47 percent voter turnout, 84 percent opposed the plan. The referendum was not binding, but Deputy Infrastructure Minister Mikołaj Wild said that the voice of the public would be taken under consideration.

In June 2019, the British Embassy in conjunction with the Solidarity Transport Hub Company held architectural workshops, inviting well-known architectural firms to share their preliminary concepts for what the project might look like. The studies are meant to serve as inspiration in preparing the master plan, and the investor is not obliged to use any of the designs. Terminal concepts were prepared by six top-name design studios: Foster + Partners, Grimshaw Architects, Chapman Taylor, Zaha Hadid Architects, Benoy, and Pascall+Watson:

Foster + Partners proposed the construction of two terminals: a main one, shaped like a "key" and with a layout very similar to Chek Lap Kok Airport (another airport project designed by Foster + Partners) plus a supplementary one with a letter "X" shape, which would be created in the second stage. Thus, the company proposed a modular construction of the airport, which can be expanded in time and adapted to the needs of growing air traffic. Both parts are to be integrated with each other (e.g. through a shuttle line between terminals), with the second one being created when market demand justifies airport expansion.

Grimshaw Architects came up with the concept of a "democratic hub", trying to invoke the Polish tradition, in particular to political changes after 1989 and to the history of the Solidarity movement. They intended the terminal to be unscaled, rational in size and devoid of the sort of megalomania that characterizes some recently built transport hubs. The idea is to reduce the transfer time and distance for passengers.

The Chapman Taylor concept involves hiding the base part of the terminal under a massive transparent dome to be located between the two runways. As its creators explain, the round dome is a symbol of infinite unity, and thus a reference to the history of Poland.

Zaha Hadid Architects prepared three equivalent visions of CPK, which are based on a different approach to connecting the airport with rail. All three projects share good lighting of the airport space, made possible through the use of large-surface transparent elements, as well as the incorporation of vegetation into the terminal interior combined with a system for maintaining it in Polish climatic conditions. The first solution situates a railway junction directly below the airport, which would allow travelers to, for example, observe oncoming trains from higher levels. The second concept envisions that just the passenger part of the station will be located directly above the platforms, connecting to other elements of the airport included in the master plan. The designers also proposed a third, more futuristic solution, in which trains approach directly to separate parts of the terminals, on platforms situated at different heights.

The Benoy project emphasizes ecology and sustainable development. They propose to build a solid Airport City around the proposed airport. Creating such an area around the port will be made possible by hiding underground parts of roads and railways in the immediate vicinity of the airport. At the heart of the system will be a glass roof covered with a transfer hub, which will integrate various means of transport and towards which communication routes will lead.

Pascall+Watson is the most general of the concepts presented. Project Director Nitesh Naidoo from Pascall+Watson presented solutions used at airports in Europe and Asia (e.g. in London, Munich, Hong Kong and Abu Dhabi), suggesting which of them should be adapted to the needs of the proposed airport. For the purposes of the presentation, he combined the idea of a "megahub" (referring to the new airport in Istanbul) and a "multi-hub" (pointing to Singapore Changi Airport in Singapore).

References

External links

Proposed airports
 
Polish Limited Liability Companies